Manuel d' Novas (February 24, 1938 — September 28, 2009) was a Cape Verdean poet and composer.

Biography
Manuel Jesus Lopes was born in Penha da França, one of the neighbourhoods of Ribeira Grande on the island of Santo Antão, he became one of the most important poets and composers of Cape Verde. His music is known all over the world, through performers like Cesária Évora, Bana and others. He lived in Mindelo on the island of São Vicente. He visited 35 Rua de Moeda where other Cape Verdean musicians visited including Bana.  He took part in the 2003 Baía das Gatas Music Festival.  Manuel died on September 27, 2009, from a stroke he suffered for three years that started in Portugal, after staying at the hospital named Baptista de Sousa for about a week. He was buried later in Mindelo.

Some famous poems in crioul 
 Apocalipse
 Nôs raça,  D. Ana, Cumpade Cizóne, Ess Pais
 Tudo tem se limite, Cumpade Ciznone
 Lamento d'um emigrante
 Biografia d’ um criol
 Lisboa, capital di sôdade (done with Rui Machado)
 Morna Morna:
Stranger ê um Ilusão
 Morna-Coladeira:
Psú nhondenga, Cmé catchorr, Morte d'um Tchuc

Discography

Recordings
"Cumpade Ciznone" by Cesária Évora in the album Miss Perfumado (1992)
"Direito Di Nasce" by Cesária Évora in the album Miss Perfumado (1992)
"Vida Tem Um So Vida" by Cesária Évora in the album Miss Perfumado (1992), together with Dany Mariano
"Barbincor" by Cesária Évora in the album Miss Perfumado (1992)
"Ess Pais" by Cesária Évora in the album Cabo Verde (1997), based on his poem "Quem ca conchê Mindelo, Ca conché Cabo-Verde"
Posthumous publications
Criod de São Vicente (2011) - some tracks

Adaptations by other artists
“Biografia d’ um criol’” (1979) in the album Djonsinho Cabral by the band Os Tubarões
"C’mê catchorr’” (1986) in the album Lamento de um Emigrante by Manecas Matos

References

Literature
 César Augusto Monteiro: Manel d'Novas: Musica, Vida, Caboverdianidade (2003)

External links
 Apocalipse and Ess Pais
 Cumpade Ciznone
 Traduction Acopalipse
 Tudo tem se limite
 Quem ca conchê Mindelo, Ca conché Cabo-Verde

1938 births
2009 deaths
20th-century poets
20th-century Cape Verdean male singers
Cape Verdean poets
Morna (music) singers
Writers in Cape Verdean Creole
People from Santo Antão, Cape Verde